Laura Andon is an Australian model, charity ambassador, TV presenter and actress. Andon has modelling experience with: Pantene, Bonds, Frat House,  Honey, and Pevonia. Andon is Clearasil's spokesperson for their ‘secrets of looking awesome’ campaign. Andon has also had small parts in films, such as "The Day Hollywood Died".

Environmental and charitable causes
Andon's charity ambassador roles include:  Clearasil, Cervical Cancer i-did CAMPAIGN,  Bonds Fashion Stylista, and VARIETY (a children's charity).
Andon was an ambassador for WWF Earth Hour 2012, following former 2011 ambassadors such as: television host Jamie Durie, actress Cate Blanchett, and model Miranda Curr. In her spare time, Andon is a keen surfer.

References

Further reading
 Teacher rides wave of success - Local News - News - General - St George & Sutherland Shire Leader
 A new face for fashion - Local News - News - General - St George & Sutherland Shire Leader
 Best face for famous place - Local News - News - Entertainment - St George & Sutherland Shire Leader
 Model's `leap of faith' - Local News - News - Entertainment - St George & Sutherland Shire Leader
 Shire girls miss out on Australia but still go to the ball - Local News - News - General - St George & Sutherland Shire Leader
 Presenter Laura Andon Poses With A Girl Dressed As Santa… Nieuwsfoto's | Getty Images Nederland | 89607611

External links
 Official website

Australian television presenters
21st-century Australian actresses
Australian female models
Living people
Year of birth missing (living people)
Place of birth missing (living people)